Jack Armstrong may refer to:

People 
Jack Armstrong (English footballer) (1884–1963), English footballer
Jack Armstrong (Australian footballer) (1899–1942), Australian footballer
Big Jack Armstrong (1945–2008), American radio personality from North Carolina
Jack Armstrong, American radio personality from northern California on Armstrong & Getty
Jack Armstrong (basketball) (born 1963), American basketball broadcaster and former coach
Jack Armstrong (baseball) (born 1965), American baseball pitcher
Jack Armstrong (piper) (1904–1978), English player of the Northumbrian smallpipes
Jack Armstrong (artist) (born 1957),  American artist, model, and jeweler

Media 
Jack Armstrong, the All-American Boy, a radio adventure series from 1933 to 1951
Jack Armstrong (serial), a 1947 Columbia Pictures film serial

See also
John Armstrong (disambiguation)